The Golo is the longest river on the island of Corsica, France, at

Course

It crosses the communes of Aiti, Albertacce, Bigorno, Bisinchi, Calacuccia, Campile, Campitello, Canavaggia, Casamaccioli, Castello-di-Rostino, Castirla, Corscia, Gavignano, Lento, Lucciana, Monte, Morosaglia, Olmo, Omessa, Piedigriggio, Prato-di-Giovellina, Prunelli-di-Casacconi, Saliceto, Valle-di-Rostino, Venzolasca, Vescovato, Vignale and Volpajola.

The Golo's source is in the mountainous middle of the island, south of Monte Cinto. 
Its entire course is in the Haute-Corse département.
The river is dammed at Calacuccia to form the Lac de Calacuccia, a hydroelectric reservoir.

Hydrology

Measurements of the river flow were taken at the Volpajola [Barchetta] station from 1961 to 2021.

Tributaries
The following streams (ruisseaux) are tributaries of the Golo, ordered by length:

 Asco 
 Casaluna 
 Bornalinco 
 Erco 
 Viru 
 Canavaghiola 
 Sumano 
 Vadone 
 Casacconi 
 Ruda 
 Acqua Fredda 
 Casa Murella 
 Ruggi 
 Pedicinque 
 Sanguinelli 
 Fosse de Ciavattone 
 Frascaghiu 
 Pruniccia 
 Petra Laccia 
 Novella 
 Pinzalone 
 Volta 
 Colga 
 Furignone 
 Stretto 
 Puretello 
 Forcione 
 Chiarasgiu 
 Arenucciu 
 Fiuminale 
 Vergalellu 
 Coticcio 
 l'Oia 
 Noceto 
 Ruisseau du Castellu 
 Falconaia 
 Sughilia 
 Lavertacce 
 Vergalone 
 Campo Piano 
 Ravin de Teghiamara 
 Corniolo 
 Maltempu 
 Buffardu 
 Canneto 
 Murato 
 Sualello 
 Catamalzi 
 Padule 
 Mazzone 
 Valde Calze 
 Volte 
 Cipetto 
 Catarette et de Lagiarone 
 Silvagnolo 
 Ciattarinu 
 Alzitana 
 Monticello 
 Balliccione 
 Curtinche 
 Mulinellu 
 Valliccone 
 Finosella 
 Scopette 
 Alzetu 
 Cruma 
 Fornello 
 Poggie 
 Piedilorso 
 la Via Secca 
 Tornaroio 
 Ficaiola 
 Novella 
 Becchittacci 
 Sialari 
 Quercitane 
 Falconaia 
 Vetrice 
 Mitalle 
 Favale 
 Zuffello 
 Funtana Secca 
 Paratella 
 l'Ortone 
 Funtana Secca 
 Cannella 
 Piubbiche 
 Favalello 
 Chiarasgioli 
 Casella

References

Sources

Rivers of Haute-Corse
Rivers of France
Coastal basins of the Tyrrhenian Sea in Corsica